The Dáirine (Dárine, Dáirfine, Dáirfhine, Dárfine, Dárinne, Dairinne), later known dynastically as the Corcu Loígde and associated, were the proto-historical rulers of Munster before the rise of the Eóganachta in the 7th century AD. They were derived from or closely associated with the Darini of Ptolemy and were also related to the Ulaid and Dál Riata of Ulster and Scotland. Their ancestors appear frequently in the Ulster Cycle. In historical times the Dáirine were represented, as stated, by the Corcu Loígde, the Uí Fidgenti and Uí Liatháin, as well as a few other early historical kindreds of both Munster and Ulster. In ancient genealogical schemes, the historical Dál Fiatach of Ulaid also belong to the Dáirine.

History
Dáirine can sometimes refer to the Érainn dynasties as a whole instead of the distinct royal septs mentioned above. The Dáirine of Munster were said to descend from a certain Dáire (*Dārios), both Dáire Doimthech (Sírchrechtach), ancestor of the Corcu Loígde, and from Dáire mac Dedad, father of Cú Roí. The two are quite probably identical. The medieval genealogists were aware of the confusion and noted it in the Book of Glendalough (Rawlinson B 502). At some point the pedigree tradition of the Corcu Loígde diverged in its forms and ceased to closely match those more common elsewhere in Ireland. The Clanna Dedad take their name from Cú Roí's grandfather Dega, son of Sen (the Old).

Notable is that the Dáirine were greatly renowned as a warlike military caste, in contrast to their agricultural and relatively peaceful successors. According to the Táin Bó Flidais, the Clanna Dedad were one of the three warrior-races (laech-aicmi) of Ireland, the others being the Clanna Rudraige (their Ulaid cousins), and the Gamanrad of Irrus Domnann, who were related to the Laigin.

However, the Dáirine appear to be most remembered in the surviving corpus for their allegedly bloody and harsh rule, in some tales even coming across as monstrous. This portrayal may or may not have any basis in ancient fact, and is possibly the invention of historians and storytellers.

Among the known surviving septs of princely origins in Munster are O'Driscoll, O'Leary, Coffey, Hennessy and Flynn, all descendants of Lugaid Mac Con. In Ulster the Dál Fiatach septs are Haughey/Hoey and Donlevy/Dunleavy.

The semi-historical Mongfind and Crimthann mac Fidaig may have derived from peripheral septs of the Dáirine, but this cannot be proved.

Figures
Legendary figures belonging to the Dáirine, descendants (and family) of Dáire mac Dedad / Dáire Doimthech, include:
 Cú Roí mac Dáire
 Lugaid mac Con Roí
 Conganchnes mac Dedad
 Fiatach Finn
 Lugaid Loígde
 Rechtaid Rígderg
 Mac Con
 Fothad Cairpthech and Fothad Airgthech
 Eochaid Étgudach
 Óengus Bolg
 Aimend
 (Crimthann mac Fidaig)
 (Mongfind)

In the Ulster Cycle
 Fled Bricrenn
 Mesca Ulad
 Táin Bó Cúailnge
 Táin Bó Flidhais

Mac Con Cycle
 Cath Maige Mucrama

Notes

References

 Best, R.I., Osborn Bergin, M.A. O'Brien and Anne O'Sullivan (eds). The Book of Leinster, formerly Lebar na Núachongbála. 6 vols. Dublin: DIAS, 1954–83. {MS folio 150b} Fland mac Lonain cecinit.
 Byrne, Francis John, Irish Kings and High-Kings. Four Courts Press. 2nd revised edition, 2001.
 Charles-Edwards, T.M., Early Christian Ireland. Cambridge. 2000.
 Hull, Vernan, "Conall Corc and the Corcu Loígde", in Proceedings of the Modern Languages Association of America 62 (1947): 887–909.
 Geoffrey Keating, with David Comyn and Patrick S. Dinneen (trans.), The History of Ireland by Geoffrey Keating. 4 Vols. London: David Nutt for the Irish Texts Society. 1902–14.
MacNeill, Eoin, "Early Irish Population Groups: their nomenclature, classification and chronology", in Proceedings of the Royal Irish Academy (C) 29. 1911. pp. 59–114
 Meyer, Kuno (ed.), "The Laud Genealogies and Tribal Histories", in Zeitschrift für Celtische Philologie 8. Halle/Saale, Max Niemeyer. 1912. Pages 291–338.
 Ó Corráin, Donnchadh, "Corcu Loígde: Land and Families", in Cork: History and Society. Interdisciplinary Essays on the History of an Irish County, edited by Patrick O'Flanagan and Cornelius G. Buttimer. Dublin: Geography Publications. 1993.
 Ó Corráin, Donnchadh (ed.), Genealogies from Rawlinson B 502. University College, Cork: Corpus of Electronic Texts. 1997.
 Ó Corráin, Donnchadh, "Prehistoric and Early Christian Ireland", in Foster, Roy (ed.), The Oxford Illustrated History of Ireland. Oxford University Press. 2001. pgs. 1–52.
 O'Donovan, John (ed. and tr.), Annala Rioghachta Eireann. Annals of the Kingdom of Ireland by the Four Masters, from the Earliest Period to the Year 1616. 7 vols. Royal Irish Academy. Dublin. 1848–51. 2nd edition, 1856.
 O'Donovan, John (ed.), "The Genealogy of Corca Laidhe", in Miscellany of the Celtic Society. Dublin. 1849. alternative scan
 O'Hart, John, Irish Pedigrees. Dublin. 5th edition, 1892.
 O'Rahilly, Thomas F., Early Irish History and Mythology. Dublin Institute for Advanced Studies. 1946.
 Pokorny, Julius. "Beiträge zur ältesten Geschichte Irlands (3. Érainn, Dári(n)ne und die Iverni und Darini des Ptolomäus)", in Zeitschrift für celtische Philologie 12 (1918): 323–57.
 Sproule, David, "Origins of the Éoganachta", in Ériu 35 (1984): pp. 31–37.
 Sproule, David, "Politics and pure narrative in the stories about Corc of Cashel", in Ériu 36 (1985): pp. 11–28.

DIL
 eDIL – Dictionary of the Irish Language Letter: D1 (D-Degóir), Columns 35 and 36

Ulster Cycle
 Cross, Tom Peete and Clark Harris Slover (eds.), Ancient Irish Tales. Henry Holt and Company. 1936.
 Gantz, Jeffrey (tr.), Early Irish Myths and Sagas. Penguin. 1981.
 Hellmuth, Petra Sabine, "A Giant Among Kings and Heroes: Some preliminary thoughts on the character Cú Roí mac Dáire in medieval Irish literature", in Emania 17 (1998): 5–11.
 Kinsella, Thomas (tr.), The Tain. Oxford. 1969.

Mac Con
 Ailill Aulom, Mac Con, and Find ua Báiscne
 Cath Maige Mucrama
 The Battle of Mag Mucrama
 Aided Meic Con
 The Death of Mac Con
 Scéla Éogain 7 Cormaic
 Scéla Cuinn 7 Airt 7 Cormaic
 Baile Chuinn
 Scéla Mosauluim 7 Maic Con 7 Luigdech

Munster
Kingdoms of ancient Ireland
Tribes of ancient Ireland
Celtic kingdoms
Historical Celtic peoples
O'Donovan family